Sampson is a surname, and may refer to:

People

A
 Adrian Sampson (b. 1991), baseball player
 Agnes Sampson, (died 1591), Scottish woman accused of witchcraft.
 Angus Sampson (born 1975), Australian actor
 Anthony Sampson (1926–2004), British journalist and non-fiction writer

B
 Brian Sampson (disambiguation), several people
 Burford Sampson (1882–1959), Australian politician

C
 Catherine Sampson (born 1962), British novelist
 Charles Rumney Samson (1883–1931), British naval aviation and armoured vehicle pioneer
 Chris Sampson (born 1978), American baseball player
 Cindy Sampson (born 1978), Canadian actress
 Clay Sampson (born 1976), Australian rules footballer
 Clark Sampson, American curler

D
 Dane Sampson (born 1986), Australian sports shooter
 David Sampson (born 1951), American composer
 Daz Sampson (born 1974), British dance music producer
 Dean Sampson (born 1967), English rugby league player
 Deborah Sampson (1760–1827), early American soldier
 Doug Sampson (born 1957), English drummer

E
 Edgar Sampson (1907–1973), American composer
 Emma Sampson (born 1985), Australian cricketer

F
 Francis A. Sampson (1842–1918), American lawyer and historian
 Francis L. Sampson (1912–1996), Catholic priest and U.S. Army officer
 Franklin Augustus Sampson (1906-1992), Canadian war hero and diplomat

G
 Gary Sampson (disambiguation)
 Geoffrey Sampson (born 1944), English linguist
 George Sampson (born 1993), English breakdancer, winner of Britain's Got Talent 2008 at age 14
 Glen Sampson (born 1960), Australian Rules footballer
 Godfrey Sampson (1902-1949), English composer and organist
 Gordie Sampson (born 1971), Canadian singer-songwriter

H
 Henry Sampson (disambiguation)

J
 Jamal Sampson (born 1983), American basketball player
 James "Jum" Sampson (born c.1876), Australian rugby union player
 Jill Sampson, Canadian veterinarian
 John A. Sampson (1873–1946), American gynaecologist
 Julia Sampson Hayward (1934-2011), American tennis player
 Justin Sampson (born 1966), Australian rugby union player

K
 Kelvin Sampson (born 1955), American basketball coach
 Kevin Sampson (American football) (born 1981), American football player
 Kevin Blythe Sampson (born 1954), American artist 
 Kyle Sampson, American lawyer and political appointee

M
 Malcolm Sampson, English rugby league player
 Margaret Sampson (1906–1988), English nun
 Marty Sampson (born 1979), Australian songwriter

N
 Nikos Sampson (1935–2001), Greek Cypriot terrorist and brief puppet president of Cyprus

O
 Oteman Sampson (born 1975), American football player

P
 Paul Sampson (born 1977), English rugby union player

R
 Ralph Sampson (born 1960), American basketball player
 Ralph Allen Sampson (1866–1939), British astronomer
 Richard Sampson (died 1554), ex-Catholic Anglican bishop of Chichester and Bishop of Lichfield and Coventry
 Richard Sampson (1877–1944), Australian politician
 Rob Sampson (born 1955), Canadian politician
 Robert Sampson (1925–2006), American lawyer, executive and advocate
 Robert Sampson (disambiguation)
 Robert J. Sampson (born 1956), American sociologist

S
 Short Sleeve Sampson, American wrestler
 Steve Sampson (born 1957), American soccer coach

T
 Thomas Pollard Sampson (1875 – 1961), Australian architect
 Todd Sampson (born 1970), Canadian-born Australian company director and television personality
 Tony Sampson, retired Canadian actor

V
 Virginia Reid Sampson (1916-1955), birth name of American actress Lynne Carver

W
 Will Sampson (1933–1987), American actor and painter
 William Sampson (disambiguation)

Y
 Yvonne Sampson (born 1980), Australian sports commentator

Fictional characters
 Dominie Sampson, from the novel Guy Mannering by Sir Walter Scott
 Kid Sampson, in Joseph Heller's classic novel Catch-22
 Kyle Sampson (GL), on the television show The Guiding Light
 Tor Sampson, a character in the Netflix series  Grand Army

See also
 Samson (disambiguation)
 Alice Sampson Presto, American suffragist and politician

English-language surnames

de:Sampson
fr:Sampson
he:סמפסון